Indomptable ("Indomitable") was a Tonnant-class 80-gun ship of the line in the French Navy, laid down in 1788 and in active service from 1791. Engaged against the Royal Navy after 1794, she was damaged in the Battle of Trafalgar and wrecked near the Spanish city of Cadiz on 24 October 1805.

Early service 
Indomptable was designed by naval engineer Jacques-Noël Sané and laid down in Brest in September 1788. She was launched on 20 December 1790, and completed in February 1791.

Between 1793 and 1794, she was under Bruix.  Her first engagement was on 29 May 1794 against  and  during the Glorious First of June campaign. Following the battle the dismasted Indomptable was towed back to Brest by Brutus.

In 1795, she served in the Mediterranean under Admiral François Joseph Bouvet and took part in the landing attempt in Ireland planned by General Louis Lazare Hoche. In 1801, she was engaged in the campaign in Egypt, but was unable to break the English blockade and stayed in Toulon. Other elements of the fleet managed to reach Elba.

Indomptable fought in the battle of Algeciras in 1801 when she was again badly damaged. In 1802 and 1803, she served in Toulon under Admiral Latouche Tréville.

Trafalgar campaign 

On 17 January 1805, she went to sea under Admiral Villeneuve, together with ten other ships of the line and eight frigates, and on 20 January the fleet sailed for the French Caribbean. Off Cadiz, the fleet was joined by the 74-gun Aigle, and six Spanish ships of the line under Vice-Admiral Federico Gravina. Villeneuve returned to Europe on hearing that Horatio Nelson had arrived in the West Indies.

Cape Finisterre and Trafalgar 

On 22 July 1805, in the battle of Cape Finisterre the quartermasters of Indomptable spotted the British fleet under Sir Robert Calder. After a violent artillery exchange, the fleets became separated in the fog. Exhausted after six months at sea, the fleet anchored in Ferrol before sailing to Cádiz to rest and refit. With his command under question and planning to meet the British fleet to gain a decisive victory, Villeneuve left Cádiz and met the British fleet near Cape Trafalgar.

Indomptable was in the Spanish line between San Justo and Santa Ana at the opening of the Battle of Trafalgar on 21 October 1805.

Downwind of the British and effectively out of range, Indomptable turned towards the bay of Cadiz. At about two in the morning of 22 October, her crew heard distress calls from the French ship  which had struck a reef off Santa Catalina fort. The ship's boat was run out and brought alongside Bucentaure, whose crew requested an anchor and hawsers to secure their vessel. This became impractical as Bucentaure settled deeper onto the rocks and began to sink: instead, Indomptables boats began ferrying sailors off the vessel and back to their own. Rescue efforts continued until mid-afternoon on 23 October, by which time Bucentaure was completely submerged.

Wreck 

On the following night, a storm broke Indomptables anchor chains and she was carried onto rocks offshore from Cadiz. Contemporary accounts estimate between 1,000 and 1,400 people were on board, including around 500 rescued from Bucentaure the previous night, and two men from  who had been aboard Bucentaure as prize crew. Around 150 men survived the wreck, including just two of the twenty-four officers on board.

Notes

References

Bibliography
 
 

Ships of the line of the French Navy
Shipwrecks in the Atlantic Ocean
Shipwrecks of Spain
Tonnant-class ships of the line
Ships built in France
Maritime incidents in 1805
Captured ships
Napoleonic-era ships
Maritime incidents in 1801